A VPN is a virtual private network, which are commonly marketed as a VPN service. 

VPN may also refer to:

 Public Against Violence (Slovak: Verejnosť proti násiliu), a former political movement in Slovakia
 Ventral posterior nucleus, part of the brain
 Vickers Pyramid Number, a rating of the Vickers hardness test better known by the ISO acronym HV
 Vietnam People's Navy, part of the Vietnam People's Army
 Violence Prevention Network, a German NGO, active in extremism prevention and deradicalisation
 Virtual page number, stored in a page table
 Vopnafjörður Airport, Iceland (IATA code VPN)